Viscount of Amoreira da Torre was an aristocratic Portuguese title. The title was created in 1895, by D. Carlos I in favor of Cipriano Justino da Costa Palhinha.

List of Viscounts of Amoreira da Torre
 Cipriano Justino da Costa Palhinha